I'll Take Care of You may refer to:

"I'll Take Care of You" (song), a 1959 song by Bobby Bland, which has been covered by several artists
I'll Take Care of You (Chuck Jackson and Cissy Houston album), a 1992 album 
I'll Take Care of You (Mark Lanegan album), a 1999 album

See also
"I'll Take Care of U", the Jamie xx remix of Gil Scott-Heron's version of "I'll Take Care of You" by Bobby Bland